Bones is an American crime drama television series that premiered on September 13, 2005, on Fox.

The show is based on forensic anthropology and forensic archaeology, with each episode focusing on an FBI case concerning the mystery behind human remains brought by FBI Special Agent Seeley Booth (David Boreanaz) to the forensic anthropologist Dr. Temperance "Bones" Brennan (Emily Deschanel). The rest of the main cast includes Michaela Conlin as forensic artist Angela Montenegro, T. J. Thyne as entomologist Dr. Jack Hodgins, Eric Millegan as Dr. Zack Addy (seasons 1–3; guest, 4–5, 11–12), Jonathan Adams as Dr. Daniel Goodman (season 1), Tamara Taylor as pathologist Dr. Camille Saroyan (seasons 2–12), John Francis Daley as psychologist Dr. Lance Sweets (seasons 3–10), and John Boyd as FBI agent James Aubrey (seasons 10–12).

Series overview

Episodes

Season 1 (2005–06)

Season 2 (2006–07)

Season 3 (2007–08)

Season 4 (2008–09)

Season 5 (2009–10)

Season 6 (2010–11)

Season 7 (2011–12)

Season 8 (2012–13)

Season 9 (2013–14)

Season 10 (2014–15)

Season 11 (2015–16)

Season 12 (2017)

Home media

References 

	
General references

External links 
 
 

	
Bones
Bones